Middle Eastern studies (sometimes referred to as Near Eastern studies) is a name given to a number of academic programs associated with the study of the history, culture, politics, economies, and geography of the Middle East, an area that is generally interpreted to cover a range of nations including Egypt, Iran, Iraq, Israel, Jordan, Lebanon, Oman, Palestine, Saudi Arabia, Syria, Turkey, and Yemen. It is considered a form of area studies, taking an overtly interdisciplinary approach to the study of a region. In this sense Middle Eastern studies is a far broader and less traditional field than classical Islamic studies.

The subject was historically regarded as part of Oriental studies, which also included East Asian studies and Egyptology and other specialisms in the ancient civilizations of the region; the growth of the field of study in the West is treated at that article. Many academic faculties still cover both areas. Although some academic programs combine Middle Eastern studies with Islamic studies, based on the preponderance of Muslims in the region (with Israel and Lebanon being the only exceptions), others maintain these areas of study as separate disciplines.

Controversies
In 1978 Edward Said, a Palestinian American professor of comparative literature at Columbia University, published his book Orientalism, in which he accused earlier scholars of a "subtle and persistent Eurocentric prejudice against Arab-Islamic peoples and their culture", claiming the bias amounted to a justification for imperialism. Western academics such as Irwin challenged Said's conclusions, however the book became a standard text of literary theory and cultural studies.

Following the September 11 attacks, U.S. Middle Eastern studies programs were criticized as inattentive to issues of Islamic terrorism. Israeli-American historian Martin Kramer published a 2001 book, Ivory Towers on Sand: The Failure of Middle Eastern Studies in America, and Wall Street Journal article claiming that Middle Eastern studies courses were "part of the problem, not its remedy." In a Foreign Affairs review of the book, F. Gregory Gause said his analysis was, in part, "serious and substantive" but "far too often his valid points are overshadowed by academic score-settling and major inconsistencies."

In 2002, American writer Daniel Pipes established an organisation called Campus Watch to combat what he perceived to be serious problems within the discipline, including "analytical failures, the mixing of politics with scholarship, intolerance of alternative views, apologetics, and the abuse of power over students". He encouraged students to advise the organization of problems at their campuses. In turn critics within the discipline such as John Esposito accused him of "McCarthyism". Professors denounced by Pipes as "left-wing extremists" were often harassed with hate speech. Pipes was appointed to the United States Institute of Peace board of directors by George W. Bush, despite protests from the Arab American community.

In 2010, foreign policy analyst Mitchell Bard claimed in his 2010 book The Arab Lobby: The Invisible Alliance That Undermines America's Interests in the Middle East that elements of the Arab lobby particularly Saudi Arabia and pro-Palestinian advocates were hijacking the academic field of Middle Eastern studies within several prominent American universities including Georgetown University, Harvard University, and Columbia University. This has involved Saudi Arabia and other Gulf States funding centers and chairs at universities to promote a pro-Arabist agenda. Bard has also accused several prominent Middle Eastern studies academics including John Esposito and Rashid Khalidi of abusing positions by advancing a pro-Palestinian political agenda.

In addition, Bard has criticized the Middle Eastern Studies Association (MESA) for adopting a pro-Palestinian standpoint. Bard has also alleged that MESA marginalizes non-Israel-related topics including the Kurdish–Turkish conflict and the persecution of religious minorities like Christians and ethnic minorities that are non-Arabs such as Jews, Kurds, Armenians and Yazidis. Finally, Bard has contended that since the September 11 attacks, the Arab lobby working through Middle Eastern Studies university departments have sought to influence pre-university education by tailoring education programs and resources to reflect a pro-Arabist agenda.

Academic centers
 The Middle East Centre (MEC) at St Antony's College, University of Oxford
 Department of Near and Middle Eastern Studies at Trinity College Dublin in Dublin, Ireland
 Center for Arab and Middle Eastern Studies at the American University of Beirut
 Centre for Arab & Islamic Studies (Middle East & Central Asia), The Australian National University, Canberra, Australia
 Center for Contemporary Arab Studies at Georgetown University
 Center for Middle Eastern Studies at Metropolitan University Prague
 Center for Middle Eastern Studies at the University of Chicago
 Center for Middle Eastern Studies at the University of Arizona
 Center for Middle Eastern Studies at Lund University
 Middle East Studies Institute at Shanghai International Studies University, China
 Center for Middle Eastern and North African Studies at the University of Michigan
 Center for Modern Oriental Studies at Humboldt University in Berlin
 Center for Near and Middle Eastern Studies at Marburg University
Department of African, Middle Eastern, and South Asian Languages and Literatures at Rutgers, the State University of New Jersey
 Institut français du Proche-Orient (IFPO), the French Institute for the Near East, in Damascus, Beirut and Amman
 Institute for Middle East Studies at George Washington University
 Institute of Arab and Islamic Studies at University of Exeter
 Institute of Middle East at Marmara University
 London Middle East Institute at School of Oriental and African Studies
 Middle East Center at the University of Pennsylvania
 Middle East Center at the University of Washington Henry M. Jackson School of International Studies
 Middle Eastern and Islamic Studies at New York University
 Middle East/South Asian Studies Program at UC Davis
 Middle East Studies Center at The American University in Cairo
 Moshe Dayan Center for Middle Eastern and African Studies at Tel Aviv University
 Sakarya University Middle East Institute
 School of Oriental and African Studies at University of London
 Middle Eastern Studies at the University of Texas
 UCLA Center for Near East Studies
 Brigham Young University Jerusalem Center for Near Eastern Studies
 Department of Middle Eastern Studies at King's College London,  University of London
 Center for Middle Eastern Studies at Harvard University
 The European Centre for Middle East Studies-ECMES

See also 
Ancient Near East studies
Orientalism

References

External links

Journal of Arabic and Islamic Studies
Middle East Studies Association
Middle East Institute

Library guides to Middle-Eastern studies

 
Middle East
Area studies
Judaic studies
Arab studies
Asian studies